Anil Balliram (born 27 February 1974) is a Trinidadian cricketer. He played in 25 first-class and 3 List A matches for Trinidad and Tobago from 1993 to 2000.

See also
 List of Trinidadian representative cricketers

References

External links
 

1974 births
Living people
Trinidad and Tobago cricketers